Toni Statelov (born 15 January 1950) is a Bulgarian former swimmer. He competed in the men's 4 × 200 metre freestyle relay at the 1976 Summer Olympics.

References

1950 births
Living people
Bulgarian male freestyle swimmers
Olympic swimmers of Bulgaria
Swimmers at the 1976 Summer Olympics
Place of birth missing (living people)